Cecil Arthur Butler (1902 - 1980) was an Australian businessman who established Butler Air Transport Co.

Buttler was born in Warwickshire, England, and migrated to Australia  with his family in about 1910.  In 1917 he was apprenticed to become a tool, jig and gauge maker at the Lithgow Small Arms Factory. In 1921 he transferred to the Australian Aircraft & Engineering Co. Ltd at Mascot, Sydney. In 1923 he obtained his ground engineer's licence, in 1927,  his pilot's licence.

In 1930 he designed, built and tested a small, all-metal, high-winged monoplane. In 1931, he piloted a Comper Swift from England to Australia in the record time of 9 days, 1 hours and 40 minutes.  In 1934 with the financial help of his wife's uncle, P. S. Garling,  he won the tender for the Charleville (Queensland) to Cootamundra (New South Wales) leg of the England-Australia airmail route, servicing the route with DH.84 Dragon aircraft. Four years later, with the successful completion of the contract, his company, Butler Air Transport Co. continued as a civil airline, serving centres in New South Wales and Queensland. The airline later became Airlines of New South Wales.

In 1958 he became an Officer of the Order of the British Empire (OBE)

Gallery

Publications

See also 
Butler Air Transport for the story of the civil airline he founded and managed.

References 

1902 births
1982 deaths
Australian businesspeople
Australian Officers of the Order of the British Empire
Australian aviation record holders
Australian aviators
Australian company founders